The Sin-you (Jap. 神羊, shin'yō, also called Hiai Chai, Chiai Tung, or Kai Tsi) is a mythical creature known throughout various East Asian cultures.

The appearance of the Sin-you is similar to that of a Qilin, but more feral and imposing.  It is a large quadruped with a feline or ovine body, a shaggy mane, and is either depicted with hooves or feline paws (the latter often to stress its difference from the Qilin).  It has a single, unbranching horn in the center of its head, like a western unicorn.  The Sin-you’s eyes are said to be very intense and imposing, figuratively burning into whomever it gazes at in a predatory fashion.

The Sin-you is highly symbolic of justice, and is believed to have the power to know if a person is lying or know if they are guilty with a glance.  It sometimes depicted at court beside the ruler or judge:  if a person told a falsehood in its presence, it would leap forward and impale the perjurer though the heart with its horn.  In other instances, the judge would put convicted murderers before the Sin-you, who would slay them in the same fashion if they were truly the perpetrator, but leave the innocent unharmed.

Gallery

References

 
 
 
 
 

Japanese legendary creatures
Legendary mammals